The Halman 20 is a Canadian trailerable sailboat, that was first built in 1977.

The design is thought to be a development of the Nordica 20, but was constructed with new tooling.

Production
The boat was built by Halman Manufacturing in Beamsville, Ontario, Canada, sgtarting in 1977, but it is now out of production.

Design

The Halman 20 is a small recreational keelboat, built predominantly of fiberglass, with wood trim. It has a masthead sloop rig, a transom-hung rudder and a fixed long keel. It displaces  and carries  of ballast.

The design has sleeping accommodation for four people, with a double "V"-berth in the bow cabin and two a straight settee berths in the main cabin. The galley is located on the starboard side just aft of the bow cabin.

Operational history
In a review Michael McGoldrick wrote, "unlike many boats under 20 feet in length, the Halman will generally come well equipped with lifelines, winches, and other gear. Its cabin has 5 feet of standing headroom and it is remarkably roomy for a 20 footer, although some of this space was achieved at the expense of a smaller cockpit."

In a 2010 review Steve Henkel wrote, "Best features ... the doghouse is raised a bit more than on the Nordica [20], giving an extra six inches of headroom on the Halman. The beamy hulls give good space below. Worst features: Compared to the heavier, narrower Corinthian [20], a comp, both the Halman and the Nordica can be expected to be slower, especially in light air, due to their higher wetted surface. And neither the Halman nor the Nordica can match the sailing performance of the other comp, the centerboarder Quickstep 21, with her two-foot longer waterline, bigger sail area, and deeper draft with her board down."

See also
List of sailing boat types

Related development
Halman Horizon
Nordica 20

Similar sailboats
Buccaneer 220
Cal 20
Core Sound 20 Mark 3
Flicka 20
Hunter 20
Mistral T-21
Nordica 16
Paceship 20
San Juan 21
Santana 20
Sirius 22 
West Wight Potter 19

References

External links

Keelboats
1970s sailboat type designs
Sailing yachts
Sailboat types built by Halman Manufacturing